Flókadalur is both a valley and region in Skagafjarðarsýsla that was named after Flóki Vilgerðarson, who is said to have settled the land there when he returned to Iceland, and gave the land its name.

In front of Flókadalur is the lake Hópsvatn , which is separated from the sea by a low, gravelly isthmus. Inside the valley is Flókadalsvatn . Through Flókadalur runs Flókadalsá . Several towns are in the valley, which is grassy but snowy in the winter.

Valleys of Iceland